Mario Cuba Rodríguez (born 9 December 1992) is a Peruvian badminton player. He competed at the 2010 Summer Youth Olympics, 2011 and 2015, and 2019 Pan American Games. In 2015 Pan American Games, he won the bronze medal in the mixed doubles event partnered with Katherine Winder.

Achievements

Pan American Games 
Mixed doubles

Pan Am Championships 
Men's doubles

Mixed doubles

BWF International Challenge/Series 
Men's singles

Men's doubles

Mixed doubles

  BWF International Challenge tournament
  BWF International Series tournament
  BWF Future Series tournament

References

External links 

 

Living people
1992 births
Peruvian male badminton players
Badminton players at the 2010 Summer Youth Olympics
Badminton players at the 2011 Pan American Games
Badminton players at the 2015 Pan American Games
Badminton players at the 2019 Pan American Games
Pan American Games bronze medalists for Peru
Pan American Games medalists in badminton
Medalists at the 2015 Pan American Games
21st-century Peruvian people